Strictly Illegal is a 1935 British comedy film directed by Ralph Ceder and starring Leslie Fuller, Betty Astell and Georgie Harris. It was made at Cricklewood Studios.

Cast
 Leslie Fuller as Bill the Bookie  
 Betty Astell as Mrs. Bill  
 Georgie Harris as Bert the Runner  
 Cissy Fitzgerald as Lady Percival  
 Glennis Lorimer as The Girl  
 Mickey Brantford as The Boy  
 Ernest Sefton as The Colonel  
 Alf Goddard as The Cop  
 Humberston Wright as The Reverend 
 Syd Courtenay 
 T. Arthur Ellis

References

Bibliography
 Low, Rachael. Filmmaking in 1930s Britain. George Allen & Unwin, 1985.
 Wood, Linda. British Films, 1927-1939. British Film Institute, 1986.

External links

1935 films
British comedy films
1935 comedy films
Films directed by Ralph Ceder
Films shot at Cricklewood Studios
British black-and-white films
1930s English-language films
1930s British films